The Impossible Kid is the seventh studio album by American hip hop artist Aesop Rock. It was released on April 29, 2016, through Rhymesayers Entertainment. The production was handled by Aesop Rock himself. The cover art was created by Alex Pardee.

To accompany the release of the album, Rob Shaw directed an abridged shot-for-shot remake of The Shining using small figurines, which was set to the album in its entirety. Additionally, music videos were created for "Rings", "Blood Sandwich", "Lazy Eye", "Dorks", "Kirby", "Shrunk", and "Get Out of the Car"; released eight years after the death of the song's subject and Aesop's good friend, Camu Tao.

Reception

At Metacritic, which assigns a weighted average score out of 100 to reviews from mainstream critics, The Impossible Kid received an average score of 85 based on 11 reviews, indicating "universal acclaim".

Kyle Mullin of Exclaim! gave the album an 8 out of 10 and said: "For years, Aesop Rock has been beloved for his ambitious, loquacious lyricism, but on The Impossible Kid, he's reached new artistic heights by using that elaborate wordplay to offer us a simple yet powerful glimpse at his scarred psyche."

Track listing
All songs written and produced by Aesop Rock, except where noted.

Personnel
Credits adapted from the album's liner notes.

Musicians

 Aesop Rock – lead vocals
 DJ Zone – scratching
 Grimace Federation – synthesizer , Rhodes , guitar , organ 
 James Lynch – bass guitar 
 Hanni El Khatib – additional vocals 
 Rob Sonic – additional vocals 
 Allyson Baker – guitar 
 Carnage the Executioner – beatboxing 
 Kimya Dawson – additional vocals 
 Chuck D – additional vocals 
 Onry Ozzborn – additional vocals 

Production
 Aesop Rock – executive producer
 Brent Sayers – executive producer
 Slug – executive producer, project coordinator
 Joe LaPorta – mastering
 Joey Raia – mixing
 Skye Rossi – project coordinator

Design
 Jason Cook – project coordinator
 Alex Pardee – artwork, layout

Charts

Weekly charts

Year-end charts

References

External links
 

2016 albums
Aesop Rock albums
Rhymesayers Entertainment albums
Albums produced by Aesop Rock